Thalassotalea loyana  is a bacterium from the genus of Thalassotalea.
Thalassomonas loyana can cause white plague disease in the coral Favia favus.

References

External links
Type strain of Thalassotalea loyana at BacDive -  the Bacterial Diversity Metadatabase

 

Alteromonadales
Bacteria described in 2014